The Piano Concerto No. 1 in E minor, Op. 11, is a piano concerto written by Frédéric Chopin in 1830, when he was twenty years old. It was first performed on 11 October of that year, at the Teatr Narodowy (the National Theatre) in Warsaw, Poland, with the composer as soloist, during one of his "farewell" concerts before leaving Poland.

It was the first of Chopin's two piano concertos to be published, and was therefore given the designation of Piano Concerto "No. 1" at the time of publication, even though it was actually written immediately after the premiere of what was later published as Piano Concerto No. 2.

The concerto is scored for solo piano, pairs of flutes, oboes, clarinets, and bassoons, four horns, two trumpets, tenor trombone, timpani and strings. A typical performance lasts about 40 minutes.

Influences
The piano concerto is dedicated to Friedrich Kalkbrenner, a pianist and composer whose playing Chopin admired.  Another influence is apparently Johann Nepomuk Hummel. Harold C. Schonberg, in The Great Pianists, writes "...the openings of the Hummel A minor and Chopin E minor concertos are too close to be coincidental". 

While composing it, Chopin wrote to Tytus Woyciechowski, saying, "Here you doubtless observe my tendency to do wrong against my will. As something has involuntarily crept into my head through my eyes, I love to indulge it, even though it may be all wrong." Undoubtedly, this sight must have been the well-known soprano Konstancja Gładkowska, who was the "ideal" behind the Larghetto from Chopin's Second Piano Concerto.

Premiere and critical reception

The premiere, on 12 October 1830, was "a success.... a full house." There was "an audience of about 700," according to the Kurier Warszawski. The concerto was premiered with Chopin himself at the piano and Carlo Evasio Soliva conducting. The piece was followed by "thunderous applause." Seven weeks later, in Paris, following the political outbreaks in Poland, Chopin played his concerto for the first time in France at the Salle Pleyel. It was received well, once again. François-Joseph Fétis wrote in La Revue musicale the next day that "There is spirit in these melodies, there is fantasy in these passages, and everywhere there is originality."

Opinions of the concerto differ. Some critics feel that the orchestral support as written is dry and uninteresting, for example the critic James Huneker, who wrote in Chopin: The Man and his Music that it was "not Chopin at his very best." 
Sometimes musicians such as Mikhail Pletnev feel a need to amend Chopin's orchestration.
On the other hand, many others feel that the orchestral backing  is carefully and deliberately written to fit in with the sound of the piano, and that the simplicity of arrangement is in deliberate contrast to the complexity of the harmony. It has been suggested that the orchestral writing is reminiscent of Hummel's concertos in giving support to the piano rather than providing drama. However, Robert Schumann took a rather different view when he reviewed Chopin's concerti in 1836 for the Neue Zeitschrift für Musik, stating that "Chopin introduces the spirit of Beethoven into the concert hall" with these pieces.

Structure

The concerto comprises three movements, typical of instrumental concertos of the period:

A typical performance lasts around 38 to 42 minutes.

Allegro maestoso

Both the first and second movements feature unusual modulations; in the opening Allegro, the exposition modulates to the parallel major, i-I, instead of the expected i-III. This tonal relation (i-III) between the second and the third theme finally occurs in the recapitulation, where an actual i-I modulation would have been expected, producing a different effect.

The first movement of the E minor concerto has three themes, which are introduced by the orchestra. The piano then plays the first theme (bar 139), followed by the lyrical second theme (bar 155), accompanied by the main motif of the first theme in bass counterpoint. The third theme is in E major, introduced in the exposition by the orchestra and taken over by the piano (bar 222). The development begins in bar 385, with the piano opening with the second theme; the orchestra then develops the first theme. 

The recapitulation begins in bar 486 again with the orchestra playing its opening theme. The third E major theme comes back (bar 573), except this time in G major (i-III), but eventually, the coda reverts back to E minor, and the movement ends with a piano section, followed by a sudden forte E minor chord at the end.

Romanze – Larghetto

The Romanze, although not strictly in sonata form, has its second theme of the exposition ascribe to the classical model of modulating to the dominant (I-V), and, when it returns, it modulates to the mediant (III). Chopin wrote in the same letter to Tytus, saying, "It is not meant to create a powerful effect; it is rather a Romance, calm and melancholy, giving the impression of someone looking gently towards a spot that calls to mind a thousand happy memories. It is a kind of reverie in the moonlight on a beautiful spring evening." The second movement has been described as "unashamedly heart-on-your-sleeve stuff."

Rondo – Vivace

Written with much procrastination, hesitation, and difficulty, the third movement features Krakowiak rhythms, a syncopated, duple-time popular dance in contemporary Krakow. It became one of the last pieces written by Chopin before the political turmoil in Poland that prevented him from returning. When, after completing the Rondo in August 1830, he played it privately — first with a string quartet and then a small orchestral ensemble.==

Cultural legacy
The 1976 film The Little Girl Who Lives Down The Lane featured this Concerto, performed by pianist Claudio Arrau and the London Philharmonic Orchestra. It is performed by one of the six finalists in the 1980 film The Competition. A performance of the Piano Concerto No. 1 also features prominently in the 2015 British film The Lady in the Van.

The second movement is featured at the climax of Don Hertzfeldt's 2012 film It's Such a Beautiful Day. This movement is also featured in the 1998 movie, The Truman Show, as well as in the soundtrack for the movie.

See also
 Piano Concerto No. 2 (Chopin)

References

External links 
 
 

Concertos by Frédéric Chopin
Chopin 1
1830 compositions
Compositions in E minor
Music with dedications